The 1954–55 season was Colchester United's 13th season in their history and their fifth season in the Third Division South, the third tier of English football. Alongside competing in the Third Division South, the club also participated in the FA Cup. Following a replay, Colchester were knocked out of the FA Cup in the first round by Reading. Meanwhile, in the league, Colchester's poor run of form had Jack Butler allowed indefinite leave following a bout of ill health. After resigning in January 1955, Colchester appointed Benny Fenton as his replacement, and despite an upturn in form, a run of defeats at the end of the season meant Colchester needed to apply for re-election for the second successive season. Once more, all clubs applying for re-election were successful, with Colchester receiving 44 votes, behind Third Division North clubs Grimsby Town (49 votes) and Chester City (47 votes), but eleven votes ahead of division rivals Walsall.

Season overview
Eight successive league defeats from October to December saw Colchester bottom of the league for Christmas Day, and the plight of the club had begun to have an effect on the health of manager Jack Butler. After falling ill in November, Butler was handed indefinite leave until by the club until the end of his contract in 1956. Suffering from a mental breakdown, Butler eventually resigned on 14 January 1955, while club secretary Claude Orrin was charged with finding a new manager.

During this transitional period, Orrin and Alf Miller took charge of the first-team, before appointing Benny Fenton as manager after attracting 48 applications for the vacancy. Despite a brief boost in on-field fortunes in March and early April, performances tailed off as Colchester picked up just one point in the final eight games of the campaign. The club finished bottom of the Football League and were again required to seek re-election, in which they were successful.

Players

Transfers

In

 Total spending:  ~ £1,500

Out

Match details

Third Division South

Results round by round

League table

Matches

FA Cup

Squad statistics

Appearances and goals

|-
!colspan="14"|Players who appeared for Colchester who left during the season

|}

Goalscorers

Clean sheets
Number of games goalkeepers kept a clean sheet.

Player debuts
Players making their first-team Colchester United debut in a fully competitive match.

See also
List of Colchester United F.C. seasons

References

General
Books

Websites

Specific

1954-55
English football clubs 1954–55 season